Upper Fairmount Historic District is a national historic district at Upper Fairmount, Somerset County, Maryland, United States. The district encompasses this quiet rural village situated along Fairmount Road (Maryland Route 361). The village is landlocked, rural in character, and surrounded by farms, fields, wooded land and a few modern houses.  Perhaps the most significant structure still standing is the Upper Fairmount Methodist Episcopal Church built in 1870.

It was added to the National Register of Historic Places in 1993.

References

External links
, including photo from 2002, at Maryland Historical Trust
Boundary Map of the Upper Fairmount Historic District, Somerset County, at Maryland Historical Trust

Historic districts in Somerset County, Maryland
Federal architecture in Maryland
Greek Revival architecture in Maryland
Victorian architecture in Maryland
Historic districts on the National Register of Historic Places in Maryland
National Register of Historic Places in Somerset County, Maryland